Congressional Avenue is a  highway located in Quezon City, Philippines, which spans from six lanes. It is one of the secondary roads in Metro Manila and part of it is designated as part of Circumferential Road 5 (C-5) of the Manila arterial road system and National Route 129 (N129) of the Philippine highway system.

Congressional Avenue starts from the intersection between EDSA and FPJ Avenue (formerly Roosevelt), passes through some of the Project areas, Tandang Sora, Culiat, and Pasong Tamo, and ends at Luzon Avenue at the boundary of Matandang Balara.

The avenue, being located on Quezon City, is one of the rising food destinations in the city because many food establishments such as food parks set-up shop particularly along Congressional Avenue Extension.

Route description
Congressional Avenue follows an L route from EDSA to Luzon Avenue. The main segment, west of the intersection with Visayas Avenue, is characterized by numerous intersections, where major intersections are enforced with signal lights while minor intersections with either using an unsignaled intersection or improvised u-turn slots. The extension segment, east of the intersection with Visayas Avenue, is characterized by partial control of access, where at-grade intersections are replaced by U-turn slots.

History
According to the 1949 Master Plan for Quezon City, Congressional Avenue was supposed to connect to the National Government Center at Constitution Hills (present-day Batasan Hills), which would house government offices including the Congress, where its name is apparently derived from. However, this plan was partially materialized as the road did not reach that area.

In the early 2010s, the avenue was envisioned to be extended into Luzon Avenue to complement the completion of the Circumferential Road 5 which includes the widening of the C.P. Garcia (through U.P. Campus) and Luzon Avenues, the Extension of Congressional Avenue, and the construction of the Luzon Avenue Flyover, which aims to divert C-5 and traffic from the narrow Tandang Sora Avenue in going to the Project areas and Mindanao Avenue towards the C-5 segment of North Luzon Expressway.

Intersections

References

Streets in Quezon City